Senyavin (also commonly spelled as Sinyavin) is a Russian noble family (dvoryans), famous for its Imperial Russian Navy officers.

People
Aleksey Senyavin (1716–1797), Russian admiral
Dmitry Senyavin, Russian admiral who ranks among the greatest seamen of the Napoleonic Wars
Ivan Akimovich Senyavin (died 1726), Russian rear admiral, head of the port of Astrakhan
Ivan Grigoryevich Senyavin (1801–1851), Russian statesman and senator
Lev Senyavin (1805–1861), Russian statesman and senator 
Naum Senyavin, Russian vice admiral of the Imperial Russian Navy
Nikolai Senyavin, Russian vice admiral of the Imperial Russian Navy

Other uses
Russian battleship Admiral Senyavin
Admiral Senyavin class of battleships
Senyavin Islands, a group of islands which belong to the Federated States of Micronesia
Senyavin Strait, a strait in the Bering Sea

Senyavin